St. Philip's College is a public historically black community college in San Antonio, Texas.  It is accredited by the Southern Association of Colleges and Schools and part of the Alamo Colleges District.  The college currently serves more than 11,000 students in over 70 different academic and technical disciplines. It is the westernmost historically black college or university in the United States and is located in the East Side, the historic home of the city's African American community.

History
James Steptoe Johnston, the Second Bishop of West Texas for the Episcopal Church, founded St. Philip’s Normal and Industrial School to educate and train recently emancipated slaves. Opening March 1, 1898, the school began as a weekend sewing class for six black girls, taught by Miss Alice G. Cowan, a missionary with the Episcopal Church. In 1900, Mrs. Mary E. E. (Snowden) Walker, the daughter of John Baptist Snowden, came from Baltimore to serve as the school administrator. She left after two years. 

In 1902, Artemisia Bowden, daughter of a former slave, joined the school as administrator and teacher. Miss Bowden served St. Philip’s College for 52 years.  Under her supervision, the school grew from an industrial school for girls into a high school and later, a junior college.

In 1942, the school, retaining the St. Philip’s Junior College name, affiliated with San Antonio College and the San Antonio Independent School District, marking the end of the college’s era as a private institution.

Campus

St. Philip's College operates two major campuses and seven subsidiary locations. The main campus is located on the east side of San Antonio, three miles from Downtown.  The Southwest Campus, formerly part of Kelly Air Force Base, is located on the southwest side of San Antonio and serves as a hub for technical training programs.  Courses are also conducted at local military installations, hospitals, high schools and the Central Texas Technology Center, located in New Braunfels.

During the last 20 years, multimillion-dollar capital expansions added four major buildings, including a state-of-the-art theater complex, to the main campus; the opening of the Northeast Learning Center in 1996; and the completion of the Learning and Leadership Development Center in 1997 in collaboration with the City of San Antonio. In Spring 2009, SPC expanded to include a new multipurpose facility, library, and welcome center.

Academics
St. Philip’s College offers open admission.  Admission requires completion of a student data form and submission of high school graduation transcript or GED certificate.

Liberal arts and technical courses

Major divisions include Arts and Sciences, Applied Science and Technology and Health Professions.  Students may earn an Associate of Arts, Associate of Science, or Associate of Applied Science degree, depending on major area of study.

Many departments offer one-year certificate programs, designed for concentrated study in specific subject areas and rapid entry into the job market.

The Applied Science and Technology division offers coursework in unique high-demand career and technical fields, such as Aircraft Technology, Diagnostic Medical Sonography, Construction Trades, Electrical and Power Transmission, Multi-Modal Transportation, Manufacturing Engineering Technology, plus many more.

Online Classes
St. Philip’s College offers 200+ Internet classes through its Center for Distance Learning.  Classes range from Accounting, to Pathophysiology, to Web Design.

References

External links
Official website
St. Philip's College at The Handbook of Texas Online

African-American history in San Antonio
Educational institutions established in 1898
Universities and colleges accredited by the Southern Association of Colleges and Schools
Alamo Colleges District
Historically black universities and colleges in Texas
1898 establishments in Texas